Saddar Bazaar is usually the main market or bazaar in most of the Cantonments of India and Pakistan.

Meanings and derivation
The word Saddar is derived from Arabic which means, the 'Chest', 'Center' or 'Main'. Owing to this derivation, it means the Central or Main bazaar. During the British Raj in South Asia, a number of Garrisons were established throughout Pakistan and India. Most of these cantonments, especially in Punjab region had one, two or three of the following bazaars:
1. Saddar Bazaar.
2. R A Bazaar i.e., Royal Artillery Bazaar.
3. Lal Kurti Bazaar i.e., Lalkurti meaning Red Shirts; derived from Redcoat, the uniform formerly worn by many soldiers in the British Army, and a name used for the soldiers themselves.

Saddar bazaars in Pakistan
Following important cantonments or cities of Pakistan have Saddar Bazaars;
1. Lahore
2. Karachi
3. Rawalpindi
4. Multan
5. Sialkot
6. Peshawar
7. Jhang

Administration and control
Saddar bazaars are usually controlled by respective Cantonment Boards which are in turn under the administrative control of Station Headquarters.

See also
 Saddar in Karachi
 Saddar, Rawalpindi
 Saddar (Hyderabad) in Pakistan
 Sadar Bazaar, Agra
 Sadar Bazaar, Delhi

References

Bazaars
Retail markets in Pakistan